Werner J. Uebelmann (16 March 1921 – 1 March 2014) was a Swiss entrepreneur and writer. He was best known for his large collection of cactus. He was born in Aarau, Aargau.

Uebelmann died on 1 March 2014 in Muri, Aargau. He was 92 years old.

References

Other websites
  

1921 births
2014 deaths
Swiss businesspeople
Swiss writers
People from Aarau